Assamstadt is a municipality in the district of Main-Tauber in Baden-Württemberg in Germany. Assamstadt is famous for its carnival.

References 

Main-Tauber-Kreis
Baden